One Raffles Quay is an office building complex located at Raffles Place, the central business district of Singapore.

Designed by Kohn Pedersen Fox, One Raffles Quay (ORQ) consists of the 50-storey North Tower and the 29-storey South Tower, totalling about 1.3 million square feet of office space. The building was purpose-built for banking and financial corporations in August 2006.

ORQ is home to international banks such as Barclays Capital, UniCredit, Credit Suisse, Deutsche Bank AG, Societe Generale Private Banking and UBS, headquarters of cryptocurrency exchange crypto.com as well as professional services firms Thomson Reuters and Ernst & Young and QBE Insurance. It also has amenities and is directly linked to Raffles Place MRT station via a Retail Link, and can be accessed from Downtown MRT station via underground link too.

See also
Tall buildings in Singapore
List of tallest buildings in the world

References

External links

Downtown Core (Singapore)
Skyscraper office buildings in Singapore
Office buildings completed in 2006
Kohn Pedersen Fox buildings